Edward Andrew George Perry (born 30 April 1934) was a Scottish football outside forward who played in the Scottish League for Queen's Park and Raith Rovers. He was capped by Scotland at amateur level.

References 

Scottish footballers
Scottish Football League players
Queen's Park F.C. players
Association football outside forwards
Scotland amateur international footballers
Footballers from Edinburgh
1934 births
Raith Rovers F.C. players
Living people